The 2018 Jerusalem mayoral election was held on 30 October and 13 November 2018 to elect the mayor of Jerusalem.

With no candidate in the first round meeting the vote threshold of 40% needed to avoid a runoff election, a runoff was held on 13 November. The election was won by Moshe Lion.

Incumbent mayor Nir Barkat did not seek reelection.

Background
In March 2018, incumbent mayor Nir Barkat announced he would forgo running for a third term, and would instead run on the Likud party's list in the next Knesset election.

Under a new national law, the 30 October election day was made a holiday. However, the day of the 13 November runoff election day was not.

The election was part of the 2018 Israeli municipal elections.

Candidates

Ran
Ofer Berkovitch, member of the Council of Jerusalem
Yossi Daitsh, deputy mayor
Ze'ev Elkin, member of the Knesset, minister of Jerusalem affairs, minister of environmental protection
Moshe Lion, member of the Council of Jerusalem, former chairman of the Jerusalem Development Authority, candidate for mayor in 2013
Avi Salman, former aide of Mayor Nir Barkat

Withdrew
Rachel Azaria, member of the Knesset (endorsed Elkin)
Chaim Epstein, member of the Council of Jerusalem

First round

Campaigning
Lion had the backing of the city's Haredi parties, which are influential in city, which has population that is more than one-fifth Haredi(between only Jews more than a third are Haredi,Arab voters who make up an estimate four in ten city's residents boycott elections). Lion, who in his unsuccessful 2013 campaign for mayor had run as the Likud nominee, ran as an independent in 2018.

Berkovitch positioned himself as a secular leader, opposing the influence of the Haredi.

Elkin boasted the endorsements of Prime Minister Benjamin Netanyahu and outgoing mayor Nir Barkat. He was considered the race's front-runner.

Unlike other Haredi political parties, the Hasidic Agudat Yisrael party did not support Lion, and instead backed the candidacy of Yossi Daitsh.

Berkovitch and Elkin assailed each other. Elkin characterized Berkovitch as young and incompetent. Berkovitch characterized the filthiness of the city as a direct failure of Elkin's as the nation's environmental minister. Berkovitch also cited allegations by the Movement for Quality Government in Israel against Elkin, which accused Elkin of using his ministerial post for self-enrichment.

Not originally seen as a leading candidate when he entered the race, Berkovitch was seen as benefiting from the crowded size of the field of candidates running, and rose to become a front-runner.

Polling

Results
The failure of Elkin to advance to the runoff was considered an upset defeat.

The results of the first round of voting in Jerusalem, with 254,326 voters participating of 638,065 eligible (a 39.86% turnout), are as follows. Of the 254,326 votes, 248,585 were valid.

Runoff

Campaigning
Heading into the runoff, Lion continued to enjoy backing from the Haredi community, including the endorsements of the Degel HaTorah and Shas Haredi political partie, as well as the right wing Yisrael Beiteinu party. However, the day before the election, the rabbinical council of the Agudat Yisrael party instructed their supporters not to vote in the runoff, which was seen as aiding Berkovitch's chances against Lion.

Lion received the endorsement of outgoing mayor Barkat in the runoff. He was also endorsed by the local chapters of the Likud and The Jewish Home parties, as well as several Likud party ministers.

Lion was seen as the candidate in the runoff representing the right wing.

Prime Minister Netanyahu did not endorse a candidate in the runoff.

As is typical, the Arab populace in East Jerusalem boycotted the election.

Polling

With Berkovitch and Elkin

Results
The results of the second round of voting in Jerusalem are as follows. The voter turnout was 35%.

References

Jerusalem
2018 in Jerusalem
2018
October 2018 events in Asia
November 2018 events in Asia